Bear Creek Canyon Drive, a linear district, includes two miles of scenic road, which is now part of State Highway 74. The drive is between the town of Morrison and the town of Idledale. The scenic drive connects to the west border of the Red Rocks Mountain Park District. The Denver Mountain Parks owns a  strip of canyon on both sides of Bear Creek. The park was purchased in 1928, and the road ran along the stream and was subject to flooding. During the 1930s and early 1940s the Civilian Conservation Corp (CCC) moved parts of the road away from the stream and raised it above the flood plain. The road is maintained by the Colorado State Highway Department.  It was constructed and first maintained by the State Department of Highways, Jefferson County, and the City of Denver Mountain Parks.
The first section of the road had been a narrow stagecoach route and needed to be graded not to exceed grades more than six percent. Road improve began in 1914, with the construction of a road from Denver to Morrison.  The entire route was completed by 1921.

The scenic drive is an important part of Denver's Park and Parkway System since it is the southern gateway and provides the first glimpse of the beauties of the Denver Mountain Park System. This scenic drive is unique in the system since it is designed through tight canyon lands beside a gushing mountain stream. The drive expresses the idea of expanding the park and parkway system into the mountains and through rough terrain and unusual landforms outside the city limits yet accessible to city residents and tourists.
One of the purposes of the drive was to protect the area from the encroachment of growth and has significance in community development and planning. Growth could damage the scenic character, allow structures in the floodplain, and remove this special area from public use. This idea of protecting lands outside the city limits for scenic drives was similar to the Park and Parkway Movement, which was occurring nationwide at this time.
The drive follows the recommendations within the Olmsted Brother's plan. This drive preserves lands along a major mountain creek corridor which is specifically recommended in the Olmsted Brother's plan. Olmsted, Jr. chose lands adjacent to all the major mountain creek corridors within close reach of Denver and specifically recommended that these lands along Bear Creek be preserved as part of the Denver Mountain Park System.
The road was engineered and constructed by the CCC and exemplifies their quality and skills. The skills are not shown through shelters, picnic facilities, or other public use elements, but instead through the construction of a road and the massive retaining walls. The road must withstand the force of a roaring mountain creek, constantly battering at its edges and must be cut through solid granite.
It was designated the southern access to the mountain parks and set the stage for the mountain environment which would be experienced. It is one of a few canyon drives in the system, winding through steep enclosing cliffs. The drive provides a unique visual and sensory experience to its users.

Much of Bear Creek Canyon Drive and adjacent lands to the south were included in Olmsted's acquisition plan of 1914. This drive was originally called the Denver Motor Club Road because Idledale was the location of the well-known Colorado Motor Club.
Just to the east of this district's boundaries, in the town of Morrison, columns marked the southern entry to the Denver Mountain Park System. The now demolished gateway columns were constructed to provide a positive sense of entry. The McFarland Gateway Columns were constructed in 1917 on either side of the road. Once people had passed through this entry they had entered the Denver Mountain Park's park and parkway system. By the time they had reached this district's boundaries they were tightly enclosed by steep granite cliffs and within the drainage corridor of Bear Creek.
From the beginning, Bear Creek Canyon Drive was famous for its awe inspiring granite cliffs, diverse vegetation, immense number of wildflowers, and roaring mountain stream. The area became a favorite spot for streamside camping, fishing, and picnicking because of the abundant water, shade, grassy nooks, and willow fringed retreats suitable for tents and fishing. The drive was considered a "treasure house of beauty and pleasure" with an abundance of clear clean water heavily stocked from the Denver Mountain Park's own spawning ponds in Starbuck Park just up the road at Idledale.
One unique element is the water pipeline, which brings drinking water from Idledale to the town of Morrison. This pipeline, originally constructed in the 1920s, is located on the south side of Bear Creek at the edge of the granite cliffs and is not in the nominated boundaries. Bear Creek Canyon Drive is enclosed on each side by narrow perpendicular walls of solid granite. These dark stone cliffs tower many feet above the road and create an enclosed atmosphere. The creek roars over huge boulders throughout the length of the drive creating small waterfalls and swirling pools of water. The original road ran directly adjacent to the creek bed and crossed the creek as needed to remain on the most gently sloping terrain. Since Bear Creek Canyon was the site of some of the worst floods in Colorado, this road layout was not safe. By 1917 concrete bridges were constructed to reduce the chances of wash out and provide a safer drive. The continued location of the road in the floodway was not appropriate.

Bibliography
Benson, Maxine, Duane A. Smith, Carl Ubbelohde, A History of Colorado. Pruett Publishing Company, Boulder, 1976.
Brown, Georgina, The Shining Mountains, B and B Printers, 1976, Gunnison.
Commanger, H.S. and Alan Melvins, A Pocket History of the United States; Eighth Revised Edition, Washington Square Press, a division of Simon and Schuster, Inc., New York, 1986.
Dorsett, Lyle W. The Queen City; A History of Denver, Pruett Publishing Company, Boulder, 1977
Johnson, Charles A. A Denver's Mayor Speer, Green Mountain Press, Denver, 1969.
McAlester, Virginia and Lee McAlester, A Field Guide to American Houses, Alfred A. Knopf, New York, 1985.
Mutel, Cornelia and John Emerick, From Grasslands to Glacier; The Natural History of Colorado, Johnson Publishing Company, Boulder, 1984.
Newton, Norman T. Design on the Land; The Development of Landscape Architecture, Belknap Press of Harvard University Press, Cambridge, Massachusetts and London, 1971. Fifth Printing 1978.
Noel, Thomas J. and Barbara S. Norgren, Denver the City Beautiful, Historic Denver, Inc. Denver, 1987.
Paige, John C. The Civilian Conservation Corps and the National Park Service, 1933–1942. An Administrative History, National Park Service, U.S. Department of Interior. 1985.
Pearce, Sarah J. and Merrill A. Wilson, A Guide to Colorado Architecture, Colorado Historical Society, Denver, 1983.
Sternberg, Barbara and Gene Sternberg, Evergreen our Mountain Community. Johnson Publishing Company, Boulder, 1987.
Zamonski, Stanley, Colorado Traveler; Buffalo Bill The Man and The Museum, Renaissance House, A Division of Jende-Hagan, Inc., Frederick, Colorado, 1987.

Newspapers and Magazines
The Architectural; Forum. May 1945.
Denver, City and County of, Denver Municipal Facts, August 10, 1912, May 4, 1912, August 1918, November 1918, March 1919, May 1919, February–March 1920, April–May 1920, June–July 1921, August 1921, September–October 1921, July August 1922, November–December 1924, March–April 1926, March–April 1927, July–August 1928, January–February 1928, September–October 1929.
Denver Post, January 10, 1917; November 24, 1917; June 8, 1937; January 31, 1940; June 4, 1940; July 24, 1949.
Denver Times, June 23, 1941.
Happy Home Chats, June 22, 1936.
Rocky Mountain News, January 10, 1936; June 16, 1941.
Steelways, May 1947.

Collections
Boulder, Colorado. University of Colorado. Western Historical Collection. J.J.B. Benedict Collection.
Denver, City and County of: Parks and Recreation Department, Denver Mountain Parks Photographic Collection.
Denver, City and County of: Parks and Recreation Department, Denver Mountain Parks Map Collection.
Denver, City and County of: Parks and Recreation Department, Denver Mountain Parks, Civilian Conservation Corp Photo Collection.
Denver Public Library, Western History Department. Scrapbook, Newspaper articles, 1914.
Denver Public Library, Western History Department, Lookout Mountain Drive: One Day in Denver's New Mountain Parks, Denver, City and County of, 1916.

Public Documents
Colorado Historical Society, Office of Archaeology and Historic Preservation. National Register Theme Nomination: "The Denver Park and Parkway System." 1986
National Recreational School, Out-of-Citv Parks and Recreation Areas serving Cities of 50,000 and Over: A Study Report for the National Park Service, New York, 1957.

References

Buildings and structures completed in 1914
Jefferson County, Colorado
Historic districts on the National Register of Historic Places in Colorado
National Register of Historic Places in Jefferson County, Colorado
Roads on the National Register of Historic Places in Colorado